BBHT may refer to:

Barabar halt railway station, a halt railway station on the Patna-Gaya line in the Indian state of Bihar
Blue-Blazed Trails, a trail system in Connecticut
Bugsworth Basin Heritage Trust, a British organisation for canal restoration